Copelatus senegalensis is a species of diving beetle. It is part of the subfamily Copelatinae in the family Dytiscidae. It was described by Lagar & Herondo in 1991.

References

senegalensis
Beetles described in 1991